Elections to Barnsley Metropolitan Borough Council were held on 5 May 1983. One third of the council was up for election. Prior to the election the defending councillor in Darton had defected to Independent Labour from  Residents. The election resulted in Labour retaining control of the council.

Election result

This resulted in the following composition of the council:

Ward results

+/- figures represent changes from the last time these wards were contested.

References

1983 English local elections
1983
1980s in South Yorkshire